Morguard Investments Ltd v De Savoye, [1990] 3 SCR 1077 is the leading decision of the Supreme Court of Canada on the enforcement of extraprovincial judgments. The Court held that the standard for enforcing a default judgment from a different province is not the same as if it were from another country; rather the Court adopts the test from Indyka v Indyka, [1969] 1 AC 33 (HL) and Moran v Pyle National (Canada) Ltd, [1975] 1 SCR 393 where there must be a "real and substantial connection" between the petitioner and the country or territory exercising jurisdiction.

Background
De Savoye, the appellant, was the mortgagor of a property in Alberta and resided in British Columbia. The mortgage defaulted and the respondents brought action in Alberta, for the land they had mortgaged in that same province.

The appellant chose not to appear or defend his actions.  The respondents obtained judgment ex juris in the foreclosure action, and then obtained orders for the judicial sale of the properties.  They then initiated separate action in the British Columbia Supreme Court to enforce the Alberta judgments for the shortfall.

Issue
The main question placed before the court was the degree of recognition that should be accorded by the courts of one province to the judgments of another for a personal action brought forward in the second province when the defendant did not reside there.

Reasons of the court
Justice La Forest wrote the unanimous reasons of court for dismissing the appeal. After surveying the case law in both England and the United States he noted that the old common law rules, based on territoriality, sovereignty, independence and attornment, were outdated. La Forest argued that a modern approach based on the principle of comity ("the deference and respect due by other states to the actions of a state legitimately taken within its territory") and reciprocity were needed a basis of recognizing foreign judgments. The infringement on the nation's sovereignty is justified where there is mutual convenience between states. The earlier views of distrusting the justice system of other countries, he argued, was outdated. Instead, he emphasized that the business community operates on a world economy and so the law must accommodate "the flow of wealth, skills and people across state lines".

On the basis of Canada's federal system comity should be even stronger between provinces, which share a much deeper bond than nations, based on shared citizenship and a common market. In that regard,

For La Forest, the concern was to define an outer limit of comity. The solution was to limit the jurisdiction to where there is a "real and substantial connection" between the action and the province. He intentionally left the meaning of "real and substantial connection" open, stating:

Aftermath
The test established in this case was later elaborated on by the Court of Appeal for Ontario in Muscutt v Courcelles, where a list of eight factors was given to be considered when determining whether a real and substantial connection exists:

 the connection between the forum and the plaintiff's claim;
 the connection between the forum and the defendant;
 unfairness to the defendant in assuming jurisdiction;
 unfairness to the plaintiff in not assuming jurisdiction;
 the involvement of other parties to the suit;
 the court's willingness to recognize and enforce an extraprovincial judgment rendered on the same jurisdictional basis;
 whether the case is interprovincial or international in nature; and
 comity and the standards of jurisdiction, recognition and enforcement prevailing elsewhere.

The Morguard principles were elaborated upon in subsequent cases, notably in:

 Hunt v T&N plc (where the Morguard principles were held to apply to constitutional challenges as well), and
 Beals v Saldanha (where the "real and substantial connection" test was applied in an international setting)

See also
 List of Supreme Court of Canada cases

References

Conflict of laws case law
Canadian civil procedure case law
Supreme Court of Canada cases
1990 in Canadian case law